Securidaca longipedunculata (violet tree) is a species of tree in the genus Securidaca. It is most commonly found in the tropical and subtropical areas of Africa, and it was given protected status in South Africa. The generic name is derived from Latin securis, as the shape of the wing on the nut recalls a hatchet. The specific name longipedunculata hints at the long peduncle on which the flowers are borne.

Description
It is a fairly small to medium-sized tree, measuring between 6 and 12 meters tall. It has pale grey, smooth bark with leaves that grow in clusters. Its small branches are covered in very fine hair. The tree produces flowers in the early part of the austral summer, and these progress from a pink to purple colour. They are sweetly scented and grow in small bunches on a peduncle. The fruit is round and is attached to a wing that becomes up to 40 mm long. The tree carries fruit between April and August.

Range and habitat
It is found in various types of woodlands and in arid savannas, and its habit varies according to climate and altitude. It may be found on either sandy, acidic or rocky soils. It is native to the North West and Limpopo provinces of South Africa, and is locally present northwards in the African subtropics and tropics. In tropical savanna, it is especially found in miombo and caesalpinoid woodland.

Threats and conservation
The species suffers from over-harvesting for use in local medicines. Periodic droughts and bush fires are also a hazard for the propagation of this tree. It is listed on the National Forests Act of 1998 of South Africa, where it is noted as a protected tree. The Royal Botanic Gardens, Kew, has also included the species in their “Adopt a seed - save a species” campaign. The campaign enables the public to purchase a Violet tree in order to protect the species and assist local communities in Mali. The initiative forms part of the Millennium Seed Bank Partnership.

Common uses

The uses of the plant include a great variety. In particular there are many different medicinal uses for this tree around Africa. It can be used to treat sicknesses as small as headaches or as severe as arthritis. This tree is also commonly used as pesticide against beetles in stored grains. This technique can be very helpful for small-scale subsistence farmers in Africa who are not able to purchase synthetic pesticides.

The roots of the tree can be used for treatments to human ailments such as coughs, chest complaints, toothaches, gout, fevers, constipation, diabetes and microbial infections. It also possesses anti-inflammatory properties that help to reduce arthritic pains.
Uses of this tree vary across different countries. A combination of both the methanol extract and the methyl salicylate component from the roots of the plant create a poison that is used for multiple purposes. This poison is used on arrows to hunt with in West Africa. In Limpopo, the VhaVenda people use the roots to prevent mental disorders and they believe that this remedy will also protect children from illnesses during breastfeeding. People in Zimbabwe use the roots to treat people who seem to be possessed by evil spirits and it is often used on snake bites. Soap, fishing nets, and baskets can be made with the bark of the tree. This tree is also used to assist some subsistence farmers in maintaining stored grains. The bark and roots of this tree can be grounded up into powder and mixed in with stored grains to create a pesticide against various beetles. This alternative to synthetic pesticides is necessary for small-scale farmers in Africa who may not have the resources or money needed for synthetic pesticides.

Practical information

As a pesticide
Its roots can be ground into a fine powder which is used to protect stored grains. Methyl salicylate is a well-known plant stress signal which often has insect repellent properties. Methyl salicylate constitutes up to 90% of the volatile component of its roots, which is very uncommon in other grains or legume seeds. A mixture of methanol extract and methyl salicylate creates a very effective natural pesticide against weevils and other insects in stored grains. Studies done on grains such as corn and cowpea indicated that after 6 days of exposure to S. longipedunculata, the mortality rate of adult beetles was 100% in an enclosed jar. In addition, when S. longipedunculata powder was applied to grains already infested with weevils, the damage done to the grains was reduced by 65%. The beetles that are most likely to infest stored grains are Sitophilus zeamais (maize weevil), Rhyzopertha dominica (lesser grain borer), and Prostephanus truncatus (larger grain borer). Studies suggest that the maize weevil is able to detect the scent of methyl salicylate and tends to avoid it. It is a repellent for insects as well as a poison, which helps to reduce the number of female eggs in the grains. As this type of pesticide use is very efficient, it allows storage of the grains for at least 9 months. This discovery provides some small-scale farmers in Africa with a low cost, natural alternative to synthetic pesticides. In some developing countries, it is difficult for poor farmers to access good quality and affordable synthetic pesticides. In addition these can harm the environment if they are not properly implemented. Such indigenous practices require further validation.

Constraints to wider adoption
The practice of using S. longipedunculata as a common pesticide for stored grains is not a widespread solution. Although it is very efficient to use this species as a tool to store grains for longer periods of time, there are constraints to wider adoption rates. A very significant problem is scarcity in natural resources. S. longipedunculata is used for various different purposes, and they often involve the roots of the plant. If the root of the plant is always being cut, it is difficult for the plant to be harvested constantly. There is little incentive to invest in a project like this because there is no assurance that the starting material can be reproduced in sufficient quantities. In addition, studies have shown that a specific concentration of the active ingredient, methyl salicylate, is needed for the powder to effectively work as a pesticide. Improved technologies are needed in order to fully cover all the seeds with the powder in order for the repellent to work. Turning over the crops and mixing it by hand can be very labor-intensive for the farmer and it doesn’t always assure full coverage of the seeds. One solution could be to create an extract by mixing the powder with water. An extract would be useful for maize seeds because the glassy surface of maize prevents the powder from adhering to its surface. This will allow the pesticide to be evenly spread out, although more tests and studies need to be done to improve this technique.

References

Polygalaceae
Protected trees of South Africa